ENN may refer to:

People 
 Enn (given name)
 Hans Enn (born 1958), Austrian alpine skier

Other uses 
 ENN Group, a Chinese natural gas distribution company
 ENN TV, a Pakistani news television channel
 Escapist News Network, a parody newscast
 Extension neural network
 Nenana Municipal Airport, in Alaska